Yargo is a department or commune of Kouritenga Province in eastern Burkina Faso. Its capital lies at the town of Yargo. According to the 1996 census the department has a total population of 14,473.

Towns and villages
 Yargo (1 014 inhabitants) (capital)
 Balbzinko (783 inhabitants) 
 Balgo (1 680 inhabitants) 
 Bissiga (647 inhabitants) 
 Bissiga-Peulh (29 inhabitants) 
 Daltenga (991 inhabitants) 
 Kamsansin (362 inhabitants) 
 Kanougou (646 inhabitants) 
 Kokossé Tandaga (883 inhabitants) 
 Kokossin Nabikome (898 inhabitants) 
 Lilyala (575 inhabitants) 
 Pissi-Sebgo (965 inhabitants) 
 Poétenga (1 216 inhabitants) 
 Sawadogo (373 inhabitants) 
 Silmaiougou-Boumdoundi (1 110 inhabitants) 
 Silmiougou-Peulh (202 inhabitants) 
 Silmiougou-Yarcé (850 inhabitants) 
 Tandadtenga (506 inhabitants) 
 Zanrin (740 inhabitants)

References

Departments of Burkina Faso
Kouritenga Province